Sébastien Bernard Henri Clément Migné (born 30 November 1972) is French football coach and former player. He is currently managing Cameroon Men's National Football Team as assistant coach.

Career

Migné was previously coach of the DR Congo national under-20 team. He was the first coach to qualify the team for the continental championships.

Migné was appointed coach of the Congo national team in March 2017. He left in March 2018.

On 3 May 2018, Migné was named the new coach of the Kenya national team. Under Migné Kenya was nominated for the CAF Men's national team of the year award in 2018, for the first time in history. He left in August 2019.

On 7 November 2019, he was announced as coach of the Equatorial Guinea national team.

He was dismissed by Marumo Gallants shortly before the club's second round 2021–22 CAF Confederation Cup game against AS Vita Club after the team had failed to win any of their first five league games, scoring only one goal, and after he had apparently directed abusive language at the club's technical director, Harris Choeu.

References

External links
 
 Sébastien Migné Interview
 Migne balancing realism and ambition with Equatorial Guinea

1972 births
Living people
French footballers
La Roche VF players
Leyton Orient F.C. players
Thonon Evian Grand Genève F.C. players
French football managers
2019 Africa Cup of Nations managers
Congo national football team managers
Kenya national football team managers
Equatorial Guinea national football team managers
Association football midfielders
French expatriate footballers
French expatriate sportspeople in England
Expatriate footballers in England
French expatriate football managers
French expatriate sportspeople in the Republic of the Congo
Expatriate football managers in the Republic of the Congo
French expatriate sportspeople in Kenya
Expatriate football managers in Kenya
French expatriate sportspeople in Equatorial Guinea
Expatriate football managers in Equatorial Guinea